is a Japanese boarding primary and secondary school in Rudgwick, Horsham District, West Sussex. The school uses the Japanese curriculum, and is one of several Japanese schools in the UK to do so. It is a Shiritsu zaigai kyōiku shisetsu (私立在外教育施設) or an overseas branch of a Japanese private school.

History
It was founded in 1972 and opened with 19 students at the primary level. The school is an affiliated educational institution of the Nippon Sei Ko Kai (the Anglican Church in Japan) and shares its name with Rikkyo University, Tokyo. Initially the school used Pallinghurst House, constructed in 1902 as its classrooms, dining hall, dormitories, chapel, and staff room. In 1973 the school's middle school opened. In 1975 the Ministry of Education of Japan approved Rikkyo School as an overseas school. Afterwards the school opened its high school division. At that time the school educated students in ages 10 through 18. Toshio Iwasaki of the Journal of Japanese Trade & Industry wrote that this school was the first Japanese high school outside Japan to open. It was the only Japanese high school outside Japan until the 1986 opening of the Lycée Seijo in France. Since opening, the school has expanded considerably and now includes a concert hall, music building, martial arts ground, a nursery school, science experiment building and sports facilities.

Notable alumni
Ken Lloyd - musician
Ken Noguchi - mountaineer and activist

See also

 Japanese School in London
 Japanese community in the United Kingdom
 Japanese students in the United Kingdom
 Japan–United Kingdom relations

British international schools in Japan
 The British School in Tokyo

References

External links

 Rikkyo School in England 
 Information in English

Boarding schools in West Sussex
Private schools in West Sussex
Japanese international schools in the United Kingdom
Shiritsu zaigai kyōiku shisetsu in Europe
1972 establishments in England
Educational institutions established in 1972